Northeastern rugby may refer to:

Northeastern University Rugby Club, the rugby team of Northeastern University
Northeast Rugby Union, the Territorial Area Union (TAU) for rugby union teams playing in the Northeastern United States